The 1984 New York Mets season was the 23rd regular season for the Mets. They went 90–72 and finished in second place in the National League East. They were managed by Davey Johnson. They played home games at Shea Stadium.

Offseason
December 8, 1983: Acquired Sid Fernandez and Ross Jones from the Los Angeles Dodgers for Bob Bailor and Carlos Diaz.
January 17, 1984: Kevin Elster was drafted by the Mets in the 2nd round of the 1984 Major League Baseball draft. Player signed May 21, 1984.
January 17, 1984: Rafael Santana was signed as a free agent by the Mets.
January 20, 1984: The Chicago White Sox choose Tom Seaver from the Mets as a free agent compensation pick.
January 27, 1984: Signed Dick Tidrow as a free agent. The Mets released him on May 8.
January 30, 1984: Released Dave Kingman.
February 19, 1984: Kelvin Moore was traded by the Mets to the Milwaukee Brewers for Billy Max (minors).
March 17, 1984: Jerry Martin was signed as a free agent with the New York Mets.

Regular season
1984 got off to an embarrassing start for GM Frank Cashen and the Mets before the season even began. Believing that it was unnecessary to protect a high-salaried, 39-year-old pitcher, the Mets left Tom Seaver unprotected. In a move that stunned the Mets, on January 20 Seaver was claimed in a free-agent compensation draft by the Chicago White Sox.

This left opening day duties to Mike Torrez. Torrez lasted only 1.1 innings against the Cincinnati Reds at Riverfront Stadium, giving up six earned runs, and giving the Mets their first opening day loss since 1974. Davey Johnson's team did, however, come back to win the next six in a row, including Dwight Gooden's Major League Baseball debut on April 7. Johnson also helped bring the Mets back in contention, producing their first winning season since 1976. Off-season acquisition Sid Fernandez made his debut with the Mets on July 16, going seven innings against the Houston Astros at the Astrodome, and earning the victory.

Season standings

Record vs. opponents

Notable transactions
May 9, 1984: Released Craig Swan.
June 4, 1984: 1984 Major League Baseball draft
Shawn Abner was drafted by the Mets in the 1st round (1st pick).
Mauro Gozzo was drafted by the Mets in the 13th round.
June 15, 1984: Acquired Bruce Berenyi from the Cincinnati Reds for Jay Tibbs, Eddie Williams and Matts Bullinger.
June 22, 1984: Released Mike Torrez.
July 10, 1984: Heathcliff Slocumb was signed by the Mets as an amateur free agent.
August 28, 1984: The Mets traded players to be named later to the Houston Astros for Ray Knight. The Mets completed the deal by sending Gerald Young and Manuel Lee to the Astros on August 31 and Mitch Cook (minors) to the Astros on September 10.
August 28, 1984: Jeff Gardner was signed as an amateur free agent by the Mets.
September 30, 1984: Jerry Martin was released by the New York Mets.

Opening Day starters
Wally Backman
Hubie Brooks
George Foster
John Gibbons
Keith Hernandez
Jose Oquendo
Darryl Strawberry
Mike Torrez
Mookie Wilson

Roster

Game log

Regular season

|-

|-

|-

|- style="background:#bbcaff;"
| – || July 10 || ||colspan=10 |1984 Major League Baseball All-Star Game at Candlestick Park in San Francisco
|-

|-

|-

|- style="text-align:center;"
| Legend:       = Win       = Loss       = PostponementBold = Mets team member

Player stats

Batting

Starters by position
Note: Pos = Position; G = Games played; AB = At bats; H = Hits; Avg. = Batting average; HR = Home runs; RBI = Runs batted in

Other batters
Note: G = Games played; AB = At bats; H = Hits; Avg. = Batting average; HR = Home runs; RBI = Runs batted in

Pitching

Starting pitchers
Note: G = Games pitched; IP = Innings pitched; W = Wins; L = Losses; ERA = Earned run average; SO = Strikeouts

Other pitchers
Note: G = Games pitched; IP = Innings pitched; W = Wins; L = Losses; ERA = Earned run average; SO = Strikeouts

Relief pitchers
Note: G = Games pitched; W = Wins; L = Losses; SV = Saves; ERA = Earned run average; SO = Strikeouts

Farm system

LEAGUE CHAMPIONS: Jackson, Lynchburg, Little Falls

Awards and honors
Mike Fitzgerald, Topps All-Star Rookie Teams
Dwight Gooden, Rookie of the Year & Topps All-Star Rookie Team
Keith Hernandez, Gold Glove & Silver Slugger
All-Star Game
Dwight Gooden, pitcher
Jesse Orosco, pitcher
Darryl Strawberry, outfielder

Notes

References

1984 New York Mets at Baseball Reference
1984 New York Mets at Baseball Almanac

New York Mets seasons
New York Mets season
New York Mets
1980s in Queens